Anthracus is a genus of beetles in the family Carabidae, containing the following species:

 Anthracus angusticollis (Peringuey, 1908) 
 Anthracus annamensis (Bates, 1889)  
 Anthracus basanicus J.Sahlberg, 1908 
 Anthracus biplagiatus (Boheman, 1858) 
 Anthracus boops (J.Sahlberg In Reitter, 1900) 
 Anthracus coloratus Jedlicka, 1936 
 Anthracus consputus (Duftschmid, 1812) 
 Anthracus cordiger Basilewsky, 1951 
 Anthracus currilis Normand, 1941 
 Anthracus decellei Basilewsky, 1968  
 Anthracus descarpentriesi Jeannel, 1948 
 Anthracus drurei (Pic, 1904) 
 Anthracus exactellus (Darlington, 1968) 
 Anthracus exactus (Darlington, 1968) 
 Anthracus flavipennis (Lucas, 1846) 
 Anthracus fonticola Normand, 1938 
 Anthracus franzi Basilewsky, 1961  
 Anthracus furvinus (Darlington, 1968) 
 Anthracus furvus (Andrewes, 1947) 
 Anthracus hauseri A.Fleischer, 1914 
 Anthracus horni (Andrewes, 1923) 
 Anthracus insignis Reitter, 1884 
 Anthracus longicornis (Schaum, 1857) 
 Anthracus madecassus Jeannel, 1948  
 Anthracus overlaeti (Burgeon, 1936)  
 Anthracus pallidus Basilewsky, 1951 
 Anthracus papua (Darlington, 1968)  
 Anthracus punctulatus (Hatch, 1953) 
 Anthracus quarnerensis (Reitter, 1884) 
 Anthracus tener (Leconte, 1857) 
 Anthracus transversalis (Schaum, 1862) 
 Anthracus ustus (Andrewes, 1930) 
 Anthracus vanharteni Jaeger & Felix, 2009

References

Harpalinae